In numerical analysis and scientific computing, a sparse matrix or sparse array is a matrix in which most of the elements are zero. There is no strict definition regarding the proportion of zero-value elements for a matrix to qualify as sparse but a common criterion is that the number of non-zero elements is roughly equal to the number of rows or columns. By contrast, if most of the elements are non-zero, the matrix is considered dense. The number of zero-valued elements divided by the total number of elements (e.g., m × n for an m × n matrix) is sometimes referred to as the sparsity of the matrix.

Conceptually, sparsity corresponds to systems with few pairwise interactions. For example, consider a line of balls connected by springs from one to the next: this is a sparse system as only adjacent balls are coupled. By contrast, if the same line of balls were to have springs connecting each ball to all other balls, the system would correspond to a dense matrix. The concept of sparsity is useful in combinatorics and application areas such as network theory and numerical analysis, which typically have a low density of significant data or connections. Large sparse matrices often appear in scientific or engineering applications when solving partial differential equations.

When storing and manipulating sparse matrices on a computer, it is beneficial and often necessary to use specialized algorithms and data structures that take advantage of the sparse structure of the matrix. Specialized computers have been made for sparse matrices, as they are common in the machine learning field. Operations using standard dense-matrix structures and algorithms are slow and inefficient when applied to large sparse matrices as processing and memory are wasted on the zeros. Sparse data is by nature more easily compressed and thus requires significantly less storage. Some very large sparse matrices are infeasible to manipulate using standard dense-matrix algorithms.

Storing a sparse matrix

A matrix is typically stored as a two-dimensional array.

In the case of a sparse matrix, substantial memory requirement reductions can be realized by storing only the non-zero entries. Depending on the number and distribution of the non-zero entries, different data structures can be used and yield huge savings in memory when compared to the basic approach. The trade-off is that accessing the individual elements becomes more complex and additional structures are needed to be able to recover the original matrix unambiguously.

Formats can be divided into two groups:

 Those that support efficient modification, such as DOK (Dictionary of keys), LIL (List of lists), or COO (Coordinate list). These are typically used to construct the matrices.
 Those that support efficient access and matrix operations, such as CSR (Compressed Sparse Row) or CSC (Compressed Sparse Column).

Dictionary of keys (DOK)

DOK consists of a dictionary that maps -pairs to the value of the elements. Elements that are missing from the dictionary are taken to be zero. The format is good for incrementally constructing a sparse matrix in random order, but poor for iterating over non-zero values in lexicographical order. One typically constructs a matrix in this format and then converts to another more efficient format for processing.

List of lists (LIL)

LIL stores one list per row, with each entry containing the column index and the value. Typically, these entries are kept sorted by column index for faster lookup. This is another format good for incremental matrix construction.

Coordinate list (COO)

COO stores a list of  tuples. Ideally, the entries are sorted first by row index and then by column index, to improve random access times. This is another format that is good for incremental matrix construction.

Compressed sparse row (CSR, CRS or Yale format)

The compressed sparse row (CSR) or compressed row storage (CRS) or Yale format represents a matrix  by three (one-dimensional) arrays, that respectively contain nonzero values, the extents of rows, and column indices. It is similar to COO, but compresses the row indices, hence the name. This format allows fast row access and matrix-vector multiplications. The CSR format has been in use since at least the mid-1960s, with the first complete description appearing in 1967.

The CSR format stores a sparse  matrix  in row form using three (one-dimensional) arrays . (Note that zero-based indices shall be used here.)

This is equivalent to  encoding the total number of nonzeros above row .

For example, the matrix

is a  matrix with 4 nonzero elements, hence
 V         = [ 5 8 3 6 ]
 COL_INDEX = [ 0 1 2 1 ]
 ROW_INDEX = [ 0 1 2 3 ] 
assuming a zero-indexed language.

To extract a row, we first define:
 row_start = ROW_INDEX[row]
 row_end   = ROW_INDEX[row + 1]

Then we take slices from V and COL_INDEX starting at row_start and ending at row_end.

To extract the row 1 (the second row) of this matrix we set row_start=1 and row_end=2. Then we make the slices V[1:2] = [8] and COL_INDEX[1:2] = [1]. We now know that in row 1 we have one element at column 1 with value 8.

In this case the CSR representation contains 13 entries, compared to 16 in the original matrix. The CSR format saves on memory only when .

Another example, the matrix

is a  matrix (24 entries) with 8 nonzero elements, so
 V         = [ 10 20 30 40 50 60 70 80 ]
 COL_INDEX = [  0  1  1  3  2  3  4  5 ]   
 ROW_INDEX = [  0  2  4  7  8 ]

  aligns values in columns: (10, 20, ...) (0, 30, 0, 40, ...)(0, 0, 50, 60, 70, 0) (0, 0, 0, 0, 0, 80).

Nonetheless, this does avoid the need to handle an exceptional case when computing the length of each row, as it guarantees the formula  works for any row . Moreover, the memory cost of this redundant storage is likely insignificant for a sufficiently large matrix.

The (old and new) Yale sparse matrix formats are instances of the CSR scheme. The old Yale format works exactly as described above, with three arrays; the new format combines  and  into a single array and handles the diagonal of the matrix separately.

For  logical  adjacency matrices, the data array can be omitted, as the existence of an entry in the row array is sufficient to model a binary adjacency relation.

It is likely known as the Yale format because it was proposed in the 1977 Yale Sparse Matrix Package report from Department of Computer Science at Yale University.

Compressed sparse column (CSC or CCS)

CSC is similar to CSR except that values are read first by column, a row index is stored for each value, and column pointers are stored. The name is based on the fact that column index information is compressed relative to the COO format. One typically uses another format (LIL, DOK, COO) for construction. This format is efficient for arithmetic operations, column slicing, and matrix-vector products. See scipy.sparse.csc_matrix. This is the traditional format for specifying a sparse matrix in MATLAB (via the sparse function).

Special structure

Banded

An important special type of sparse matrices is band matrix, defined as follows. The lower bandwidth of a matrix  is the smallest number  such that the entry  vanishes whenever . Similarly, the upper bandwidth is the smallest number  such that  whenever  . For example, a tridiagonal matrix has lower bandwidth  and upper bandwidth . As another example, the following sparse matrix has lower and upper bandwidth both equal to 3. Notice that zeros are represented with dots for clarity.

Matrices with reasonably small upper and lower bandwidth are known as band matrices and often lend themselves to simpler algorithms than general sparse matrices; or one can sometimes apply dense matrix algorithms and gain efficiency simply by looping over a reduced number of indices.

By rearranging the rows and columns of a matrix  it may be possible to obtain a matrix  with a lower bandwidth. A number of algorithms are designed for bandwidth minimization.

Diagonal
A very efficient structure for an extreme case of band matrices, the diagonal matrix, is to store just the entries in the main diagonal as a one-dimensional array, so a diagonal  matrix requires only  entries.

Symmetric
A symmetric sparse matrix arises as the adjacency matrix of an undirected graph; it can be stored efficiently as an adjacency list.

Block diagonal
A block-diagonal matrix consists of sub-matrices along its diagonal blocks. A block-diagonal matrix  has the form

where  is a square matrix for all .

Reducing fill-in

The fill-in of a matrix are those entries that change from an initial zero to a non-zero value during the execution of an algorithm. To reduce the memory requirements and the number of arithmetic operations used during an algorithm, it is useful to minimize the fill-in by switching rows and columns in the matrix. The symbolic Cholesky decomposition can be used to calculate the worst possible fill-in before doing the actual Cholesky decomposition.

There are other methods than the Cholesky decomposition in use. Orthogonalization methods (such as QR factorization) are common, for example, when solving problems by least squares methods. While the theoretical fill-in is still the same, in practical terms the "false non-zeros" can be different for different methods. And symbolic versions of those algorithms can be used in the same manner as the symbolic Cholesky to compute worst case fill-in.

Solving sparse matrix equations

Both iterative and direct methods exist for sparse matrix solving.

Iterative methods, such as conjugate gradient method and GMRES utilize fast computations of matrix-vector products , where matrix  is sparse. The use of preconditioners can significantly accelerate convergence of such iterative methods.

Software

Many software libraries support sparse matrices, and provide solvers for sparse matrix equations. The following are open-source:
 SuiteSparse, a suite of sparse matrix algorithms, geared toward the direct solution of sparse linear systems.
 PETSc, a large C library, containing many different matrix solvers for a variety of matrix storage formats.
 Trilinos, a large C++ library, with sub-libraries dedicated to the storage of dense and sparse matrices and solution of corresponding linear systems.
 Eigen3 is a C++ library that contains several sparse matrix solvers. However, none of them are parallelized.
 MUMPS (MUltifrontal Massively Parallel sparse direct Solver), written in Fortran90, is a frontal solver.
 deal.II, a finite element library that also has a sub-library for sparse linear systems and their solution.
 DUNE, another finite element library that also has a sub-library for sparse linear systems and their solution.
 PaStix.
 SuperLU.
 Armadillo provides a user-friendly C++ wrapper for BLAS and LAPACK.
 SciPy provides support for several sparse matrix formats, linear algebra, and solvers.
 SPArse Matrix (spam) R and Python package for sparse matrices.
 Wolfram Language Tools for handling sparse arrays
 ALGLIB is a C++ and C# library with sparse linear algebra support
 ARPACK Fortran 77 library for sparse matrix diagonalization and manipulation, using the Arnoldi algorithm
 SPARSE Reference (old) NIST package for (real or complex) sparse matrix diagonalization
 SLEPc Library for solution of large scale linear systems and sparse matrices
 Sympiler, a domain-specific code generator and library for solving linear systems and quadratic programming problems.
 scikit-learn, a Python library for machine learning, provides support for sparse matrices and solvers.
 sprs implements sparse matrix data structures and linear algebra algorithms in pure Rust.
 Basic Matrix Library (bml) supports several sparse matrix formats and linear algebra algorithms with bindings for C, C++, and Fortran.

History
The term sparse matrix was possibly coined by Harry Markowitz who initiated some pioneering work but then left the field.

See also

Notes

References
 
 
  (This book, by a professor at the State University of New York at Stony Book, was the first book exclusively dedicated to Sparse Matrices.  Graduate courses using this as a textbook were offered at that University in the early 1980s).
 
 
 Also NOAA Technical Memorandum NOS NGS-4, National Geodetic Survey, Rockville, MD.

Further reading
 
 
  Sparse Matrix Algorithms Research at the Texas A&M University.
 SuiteSparse Matrix Collection
 SMALL project A EU-funded project on sparse models, algorithms and dictionary learning for large-scale data.

 
Arrays